Anheterus is a genus of ground beetle in the subfamily Broscinae. The genus was described by Jules Putzeys in 1868 with the genus being found in Australia and containing the following species:

 Anheterus ambiguus Sloane, 1892
 Anheterus distinctus Sloane, 1890
 Anheterus gracilis Sloane, 1848

References

Broscini
Beetles of Australia
Carabidae genera